Vantaankoski railway station is a Helsinki commuter rail station located in Vantaa, Finland.

The station is part of the Ring Rail Line (Kehärata) route, which links Helsinki-Vantaa Airport and central Vantaa with the Helsinki commuter train network. The station was the northbound terminus for the M commuter line from central Helsinki until 2015. The next station to the south is Martinlaakso, which was the northern terminus of the M line until the construction of Vantaankoski in 1991. The station has an island platform and local bus connections are available nearby.

History 

In the 1970s, Sanoma engaged in negotiations with the Finnish State Railways over the possibility of extending the Martinlaakso line to reach its new printing facilities in the Martinlaakso district. Although the FSR expressed interest in the project at the time, the negotiations seemingly broke down at some point near the end of the 1970s.

The city of Vantaa raised the matter once again some 10 years later; its plan was to extend the line over the north side of the Ring III highway, to serve the developing district of Myllymäki. This would not happen at its full extent until the building of the Ring Rail Line, though a  extension from Martinlaakso to Vantaankoski was opened on 2 September 1991. The new station underwent several changes of name over the course of the project; from Sanomala (deemed inappropriate due to the direct reference to a private company), to Tyttökumpu (after a nearby residential area), to finally Vantaankoski, which the city of Vantaa had proposed.

The station was thoroughly rebuilt during the Ring Rail Line project. A brand new pedestrian bridge over the north side of the platforms was built, establishing a new connection for use by arriving and departing passengers.

Services 

Vantaankoski is served by lines I and P to the Helsinki Airport on the Helsinki commuter rail network. Both of these lines make stops at all stations on their routes. P trains to the airport stop on track 1, while I trains to Helsinki use track 2.

HSL bus connections are provided with the Vantaankosken asema terminus on the east side of the station, as well as the Kivivuorentie stops on the streets of Kivivuorentie and Martinkyläntie. The terminus is accompanied by a Vantaa city bike terminal. Park and ride services are provided with a parking lot on the western side. The Vantaankoski station, as well as its surrounding bus stops, belong to HSL fare zone .

Gallery

References

External links
 
 Train arrivals and departures at Vantaankoski on Finrail
 Official site of the planning of Kehärata

Railway stations in Vantaa
Railway stations opened in 1991
1991 establishments in Finland